Luis Manuel Irizarry Pabón (b. Ponce, Puerto Rico; 12 November 1958) is the current mayor of the municipality of Ponce, Puerto Rico.

Biography
Luis Manuel Irizarry Pabón was born on 12 November 1958 in Ponce, Puerto Rico. His parents were Félix Irizarry and Carmen Lydia Pabón. A graduate of the University of Puerto Rico, Medical Sciences Campus, Irizarry Pabón was an internal medicine physician prior to becoming Ponce's mayor-elect in November 2020. He was also performing as a municipal legislator, minority leader in the Ponce Municipal Legislature. Winning by a landslide against Partido Nuevo Progresista incumbent mayor María Meléndez, Irizarry Pabón was scheduled to take office on 11 January 2021; He was sworn on 13 January 2021. He is a graduate of the School of Medicine of the Universidad de Puerto Rico, Recinto de Ciencias Medicas.

Political victory
Upon completion of the 2020 Ponce municipal election vote count Irizarry Pabón had received 28,728 votes (62%) to incumbent mayor María Meléndez Altieri's 12,314  votes (26.6%). The rest of the votes cast were for MVC and PIP. Irizarry Pabón is the first mayoral candidate in the modern history of Ponce to win with more than 60% of votes cast. His 16,414 vote margin was also historic being the largest since 1996, when then-mayor Rafael Cordero Santiago had a lead of over 19,000 votes versus José Dapena Thompson. Irizarry Pabón recovered the Ponce mayoral office for his PPD party after 12 years under the control of the Partido Nuevo Progresista (PNP).

Family and personal
As of 11 November 2020, Irizarry Pabón was 62 years old. He has four children: Alma, Luis Manuel, María Isabel, and Yaniel.

Notes

References

1958 births
Popular Democratic Party (Puerto Rico) politicians
Living people
University of Puerto Rico alumni
Physicians from Ponce
Mayors of Ponce, Puerto Rico